Chubak is a surname. Notable people with the surname include:

Sadeq Chubak (1916–1998), Iranian author
Vasyl Chubak (born 1964), Ukrainian businessman